9-1-1, commonly referred to as 911, is the national emergency telephone number of the Philippines managed by the Emergency 911 National Office.

On August 1, 2016, 911 and 8888, a public complaint hotline, effectively replaced Patrol 117.

History

Prior to the inception of 117, emergency services were reached through a myriad of telephone numbers.  The fire department in Manila, for example, had fifty telephone numbers, one for every fire station in the city. In February 1998, the 117 hotline was implemented by PLDT. At the time, 117 was solely used in the Metro Manila area by the Philippine National Police for the reporting of ongoing crimes as part of a program called the "Patrol 117 Street Patrol Program" in cooperation with the Foundation for Crime Prevention. Efforts to expand the capabilities of 117 began in the 1990s, starting with the addition of emergency medical services to the scope of 117 in Metro Manila through a private-sector initiative called Project EARnet (Emergency Assistance and Response network).

Government involvement in the expansion of 117's scope began in late 1998, when the DILG announced the formation of Emergency Network Philippines, a project that sought to support a national emergency telephone number in order to enable the faster delivery of emergency services to the Filipino people.

On August 8, 2001, a memorandum of agreement was signed between the DILG and Frequentis, an Austrian company, on the implementation of the ENP project. The National Economic and Development Authority approved the project later in the year, and project funding was secured with a loan agreement being signed between the Philippine and Austrian governments on December 6.

By virtue of Executive Order No. 226, 117 became the official national emergency telephone number of the Philippines on July 14, 2003.

The ₱1.4 billion project was completed on August 2, 2003, with the opening of a new 117 call center in Quezon City, serving the entire Metro Manila area. Four more 117 call centers were opened in 2006, and the full network, consisting of sixteen networked call centers, was rolled out in 2007.

In 2016, at his first cabinet meeting after his inauguration, President Rodrigo Duterte vowed to put up a complaint hotline, 8888, while Presidential Communications Secretary Martin Andanar said that the existing 117 hotline would be replaced by 911.

On August 1, 2016, 911 was launched as the nationwide emergency hotline number by the Philippine National Police (PNP).

9-1-1 is patterned on the same system that was implemented in Davao City by President Rodrigo Duterte while he was still mayor.

Coverage
911 service is available nationwide 24/7. Depending on the location of the call, a 911 call will route to any of the sixteen existing 117 call centers located in various cities around the Philippines. Each call center serves a single region.

Telecommunications Commissioner Gamaliel Cordoba said that all calls to 911 will be rerouted to the existing Patrol 117 hotline while the 911 command center is not yet established.

Existing 117 call centers are located in the following areas:

Other Emergency numbers 
Other than 911, other emergency numbers are also used around the country, maintained and operated by both government agencies and the private sector.

References

External links
Emergency Network Philippines

Emergency telephone numbers
Three-digit telephone numbers
Telephone numbers in the Philippines